Teesside University is a public university with its main campus in Middlesbrough, North Yorkshire in North East England. It has over 21,000 students studying in the UK, according to the 2020/21 HESA student record.

History 
A shortage of funding long proved a barrier to developing the Middlesbrough-based Mechanics' Institute of 1844. With the required funding, the college's launch could have come as early as 1914. Even after the donation of £40,000 to build the college from local shipping magnate Joseph Constantine in 1916, progress was slow. A Governing Council took place in 1922, followed by a doubling of the original financial offer by the Constantine family in 1924. For the task of constructing the first technical college building, Graham R. Dawbarn (a London architect also responsible for additions to Corpus Christi College, Cambridge) was appointed on 29 March 1926. Building work began in 1927, culminating in the beginning of enrolment and teaching on 16 September 1929.

Constantine Technical College was formally opened on 2 July 1930 by the future King Edward VIII, the Prince of Wales. Although not yet a university, Constantine was a further and higher education college from the outset. Students at Constantine could be as young as 15. Degree courses, published in the college's prospectus were validated by the University of London. Disciplines included metallurgy, engineering and chemistry. Five rooms were also reserved for an art department, until cramped accommodation forced the School of Art to split from its parent site for the 1950s.

The 1960s were years of sweeping change. By the end of the decade the first two "Teesside University" campaigns had begun: the first, from the early 1960s to 1966, and the second, from 1967 to 1972. Spates of enthusiasm were killed off on each occasion by the scepticism of then-Minister of Education, Anthony Crosland, and Margaret Thatcher's defining white paper, respectively. The latter effectively shelved plans for the erection of any new institution in the United Kingdom, until the 1980s at least.

On campus, one of the most visible major developments for the college was an extension in 1963 which featured an 11-storey "skyscraper". The college also acquired the neighbouring former High School of 1877. The college briefly restyled itself as "Constantine College of Technology", before becoming "Teesside Polytechnic" (Britain's 13th Polytechnic) in 1969. At that point, the institution ran seventeen degree courses.

A merger with Teesside College of Education took place in the 1970s along with the purchase of Flatts Lane. The Clarendon Building was added in 1973, as was the Stephenson Building in 1976. Both of these buildings remained in use for the Polytechnic's long-awaited conversion into a university. That happened on 16 June 1992, when Teesside Polytechnic became the University of Teesside, one of the UK's first new universities following that year's Further and Higher Education Act.

By the 1990s, the institution had almost 8,000 students. In 1997 the old Polytechnic's library was replaced with a Learning Resource Centre. Subsequent additions included the Virtual Reality Centre and Centre for Enterprise, and later, the Phoenix and Athena Buildings by CPMG Architects. Today, historic structures such as the old High School (the Waterhouse building), the Constantine building and Victoria Building of 1891 (a schoolyard-equipped Victorian school, housing a series of graduate business incubator units), are all Grade II listed buildings.

In 2009, the University of Teesside changed its name to "Teesside University". It also changed its logo and adopted the motto "Inspiring success" as part of a £20,000 rebrand. Alternative names included "Middlesbrough University" and "Tees Valley University".

On 15 October 2009, Teesside was named University of the Year and awarded "Outstanding Employer Engagement Initiative" in the Times Higher Education Awards.

In 2010, the £17 million Centuria South building for dental training and sports therapy was opened. This continues to provide specialist facilities. A major phase of development known as campus Heart began in 2014. This £22 million landmark development created a central focus to the Middlesbrough campus. It also brought The Curve, a new £20 million teaching building. As part of this £280 million investment period, a "living wall" was created around a giant plasma screen on the side of the university's Student Centre. In September 2017, the university unveiled a £300 million campus masterplan set to transform its campus across the following decade.

In March 2021, the university and the Tees Valley Mayor and Combined Authority announced the development of the £13.5 million Net Zero Industry Innovation Centre (NZIIC). Located at Middlesbrough's Tees Advanced Manufacturing Park (TeesAMP), the facility will support the region's ongoing drive for clean energy and sustainability.

Campuses and buildings

Middlesbrough

Since its formation as Constantine Technical College in 1930, Teesside University has been located in the borough of Middlesbrough in the North Yorkshire area of England on the south banks of the River Tees. Transport links exist through the A19 and A66 roads. The university's main entrance is at the site of the old Constantine College building, fronted by the Waterhouse clock tower.

Campus Heart is the latest phase of investment in the Middlesbrough campus and has seen £30 million of development in total. It sits within a pedestrianised and landscaped area which is seen as a focal point to the campus.

In 2015, £6 million was invested in the refurbishment and extension of the university's Orion Building – this includes a three-storey glass extension to house new, industry-standard equipment. It was announced in August 2015, that a further £2.5 million is to be invested in the award-winning Students' Union, and £2 million on campus catering facilities. The library is also expected to see a £5 million investment.

A £2.5 million health and fitness centre opened at Teesside University's Middlesbrough campus in January 2016.

£300 million is set to be spent on the university's campus between 2017 and 2027.

Student accommodation
Teesside University provides accommodation in self-catered rooms which are mostly reserved for first year undergraduate students. Accommodation is also available for international students, postgraduates, staff and undergraduates.

The university has a range of managed residences (halls, houses and flats). Further places are available through the university managed housing scheme (properties owned by private landlords but managed by the university).

In 2015, the university acquired Teesside Central, adding 75 en-suite apartments to its accommodation portfolio. This accommodation is known as Central Halls.

Art gallery
Middlesbrough Institute of Modern Art, or MIMA, is a contemporary art gallery in the centre of Middlesbrough, run in partnership with Teesside University.

Darlington

The university opened its original Darlington campus in the former Eastbourne Secondary School in the Eastbourne area of Darlington. A new £13 million Darlington campus opened in 2011 at Central Park. Today the Darlington campus is known as the Centre for Professional and Executive Development (CPED).

London
The university is set to open a London campus in the Here East complex (the former Olympic media centre) near the Hackney Wick area of London.

Academic profile 

Teesside University has won seven National Teaching Fellowships.

The Vice-Chancellor is Professor Paul Croney, who took up the position in May 2015 when Professor Graham Henderson retired. In April 2005, the university welcomed Lord Sawyer as its Chancellor, succeeding the university's first ever Chancellor, European Commissioner Leon Brittan.

Research
Teesside University's research is focused on addressing five thematic areas.

In research, the university offers an array of routes of study resulting in the qualification of MPhil, PhD, MProf and DProf.

Student life
The Students' Union is led by students for students with three current students elected by the student body to hold the positions of President Education, President Activities and President Welfare in March of each year. They take their posts from July to the end of June each year and have the option to seek re-election for a second and final term if they wish.
As the officer trustees they sit on a wider board of trustees who oversee the running of the Students' Union which also includes external trustees drawn from the worlds of local government, business, charity and the public sector.

The union was named Students' Union of the Year at the Bar Entertainment and Dance Association Awards in 2004 and Club Mirror Students' Union of the Year in 2002, as well as finishing runner-up in the latter award in 2007. In 2002/2003, the Students' Union also won the Sport England Volunteer Investment Programme Award, while the Union's bar, The Terrace Bar, was awarded Best Bar None status in 2006 and 2008, overcoming competition from universities from across the two regions of the North East and Yorkshire before going on to win four Best Bar None Middlesbrough Awards 2009 recognising outstanding standards of staff training and strong focus on the safety of customers. The Students' Union also won the 2007 It's Not Funny competition, winning a live comedy performance featuring Bill Bailey, Marcus Brigstocke, Andrew Maxwell and Simon Amstell. More recently the SU was shortlisted for NUS Students' Union of the Year in 2014, secured the AQS accreditation for the SU Link and gold in the National Best Bar None Awards 2015 recognising exceptional standards in its social spaces The Terrace and The Hub.

From 2014 the Students' Union has received over £8.5 million to refurbish its building and facilities.

Cancelled film screening 

Conservative Party candidate and filmmaker John Walsh made a film of the 2010 General Election entitled ToryBoy The Movie in 2011. The film's re-release in 2015 caused controversy after it was not shown at Teesside University. According to the film-maker, the film was booked by the Student Union, but at the last minute the screening was abruptly halted. The Student Union said the booking was never confirmed. The North Crowd featured an interview with John Walsh on their website where they showed the actual print work that was created by the Student Union

Notable people

Vice-Chancellors of Teesside University 
 Michael Longfield (1992)
 Professor Derek Fraser (1992–2003)
 Professor Graham Henderson (2003–2015)
 Professor Paul Croney (2015–)

Chancellors of Teesside University
 Leon Brittan, Baron Brittan of Spennithorne (1993–2005)
 Tom Sawyer, Baron Sawyer of Darlington (2005–2017)
 Paul Drechsler CBE (2017– )

Notable staff
 Philippa Gregory, novelist
 Gervase Phinn, Visiting Professor of Education
 Anthony James Pollard, medieval historian
Chris Stevenson, author and currently professor of mental health nursing at Dublin City University

Notable alumni

In academia there are Shirley Congdon, Anne Curry, Jack Hodgson (historian), Julie Mennell and Nicole Westmarland.

In politics and government: Vera Baird QC, former Member of Parliament for Redcar and former Solicitor General for England and Wales (MA in Local History in c.2004). David Bowe (politician) Jacob Young (politician), Emily Brothers, Deborah Cadman, Khairul Khalil, Ray Mallon, Paul Marsden and Jill Mortimer.

In the arts and media, Stephen Uppal, actor in Hollyoaks (BA (Hons) English Studies in 2002), Wendy Craig, Jamie Dornan, Skin (musician), Mackenzie Thorpe, Rupert Williamson, Tom Blenkinsop and Brendan Cleary.

Sports people include Ajaz Akhtar, Christian Burgess, Ben Everson, Johanna Jackson, Beth Mead, Chris Newton, Sophie Spence and Harry Tanfield.

In religious leadership, David W. Eka.

See also
 Armorial of UK universities
 List of universities in the UK
 Post-1992 universities
Pseudomonas teessidea, a species of bacterium named for the university
 Teesside

References

External links

 Teesside University
 Teesside University Students' Union

 
Educational institutions established in 1929
Education in Middlesbrough
1929 establishments in England
Teesside
University Alliance
Buildings and structures in Middlesbrough
Universities UK